Baron Howard of Glossop, in the County of Derby, is a title in the Peerage of the United Kingdom, since 1975 a subsidiary title of the dukedom of Norfolk. It was created in 1869 for the Liberal politician Lord Edward Howard, the second son of Henry Fitzalan-Howard, 13th Duke of Norfolk. His grandson, the third Baron (who succeeded his father), married Mona Stapleton, 11th Baroness Beaumont. Their eldest son, Miles, succeeded his mother in the barony of Beaumont in 1971 and his father in the barony of Howard of Glossop in 1972. In 1975 he also succeeded in the dukedom of Norfolk on the death of his cousin, Bernard Fitzalan-Howard, 16th Duke of Norfolk. The two baronies are now subsidiary titles of the dukedom of Norfolk. See this title for further history of the peerages.

Barons Howard of Glossop (1869)
Edward George Fitzalan-Howard, 1st Baron Howard of Glossop (1818–1883)
Francis Edward Fitzalan-Howard, 2nd Baron Howard of Glossop (1859–1924)
Bernard Edward Fitzalan-Howard, 3rd Baron Howard of Glossop (1885–1972)
Miles Francis Stapleton Fitzalan-Howard, 4th Baron Howard of Glossop (1915–2002) (succeeded as 17th Duke of Norfolk in 1975)
Edward William Fitzalan-Howard, 18th Duke of Norfolk (born in 1956)

Family tree

See also
Duke of Norfolk
Earl of Carlisle
Earl of Suffolk
Earl of Berkshire
Earl of Effingham
Viscount Fitzalan of Derwent
Baron Lanerton
Baron Howard of Penrith
Baron Howard of Escrick
Baron Stafford
Baron Howard de Walden

References

Work cited

Baronies in the Peerage of the United Kingdom
Noble titles created in 1869
Noble titles created for UK MPs